Thomas John Dixon Halliday is a British palaeobiologist and author.

Halliday earned a degree in natural sciences (zoology) from the  University of Cambridge, followed by a master's in palaeobiology from the University of Bristol, and a PhD in palaeobiology from University College London.

Halliday was awarded the Linnean Society Medal for the best doctorate in biological studies.

In 2022, Halliday published Otherlands: A World In The Making about the history of life on Earth. In 2022, it was shortlisted for the James Cropper Wainwright Prize for Nature Writing, and longlisted for the Baillie Gifford Prize for Non-Fiction.

The Sunday Times noted its "Sixteen superbly vivid snapshots of our prehistoric world". New Scientist called it a "A fascinating journey through Earth's history".

Publications
Otherlands: A World In The Making, Allen Lane, 2022

References

External links 
Official website

Living people
British palaeontologists
British non-fiction writers
Alumni of the University of Cambridge
Alumni of the University of Bristol
Alumni of University College London
Year of birth missing (living people)